Unasuchus is an extinct genus of Early Cretaceous eusuchian belonging to the family Hylaeochampsidae. The genus is named after Uña, a municipality in central Spain where fossils have been found.

Discovery and classification
Unasuchus is known only from skull and jaw fragments, meaning that it initially defied precise classification within Crocodyliformes,  but the cladistic analysis of Turcosuchus recovers Unasuchus as a derived hylaeochampsid. These remains have been found from the Barremian Las Hoyas Formation. The type species, U. reginae, was named in 1992.

References

Neosuchians
Early Cretaceous crocodylomorphs of Europe
Early Cretaceous reptiles of Europe
Cretaceous Spain
Fossils of Spain
La Huérguina Formation
Fossil taxa described in 1992
Prehistoric pseudosuchian genera